Tetragenococcus halophilus is a halophilic lactic acid bacterium active in the fermentation processes of soy sauce, miso, fish sauce and salted anchovies.

See also
Tetragenococcus muriaticus

References

External links 
Type strain of Tetragenococcus halophilus subsp. halophilus at BacDive -  the Bacterial Diversity Metadatabase
Type strain of Tetragenococcus halophilus subsp. flandriensis at BacDive -  the Bacterial Diversity Metadatabase

Enterococcaceae
Bacteria described in 1934